John Edwin Brainard (August 27, 1857 – September 8, 1942) was an American politician who was the 80th Lieutenant Governor of Connecticut from 1925 to 1929. He previously served as President pro tempore of the Connecticut Senate.

Biography
Brainard was born in 1857 in Meriden, Connecticut, the son of Dr. Edwin W. Brainard and Madilena S. Smith Brainard. When he was 5, his family moved to nearby Branford where he attended the public schools and graduated from high school. He studied medicine with his father, but his studies stopped with the death of his father, who was struck and killed by a train while driving to answer a sick call. He married Lizzie C. Bartholomew and they had three sons, Halstead, Norman, and Spencer.

Career
In 1880, Brainard moved to Meriden and was employed by the Meriden Malleable Iron Company until 1891. He resigned to go into the bicycle business on Church street, Brainard and Wilcox, which continued until 1817 when he sold out to his partner and took a position with the firm of Ives, Uphani and Rand until 1898, when he was appointed street superintendent. Elected as a member from Branford of the Connecticut House of Representatives, he served in that office from 1919 to 1920.

Brainard was elected as a Republican Lieutenant Governor of Connecticut and served from 1925 to 1929. He was a delegate to Republican National Convention from Connecticut, 1928.

Death
Brainard died in 1942. He was buried at the Branford Center Cemetery.

References

External links
Connecticut State Library
J. Edwin Brainard's obituary

1857 births
1942 deaths
Politicians from Meriden, Connecticut
Republican Party members of the Connecticut House of Representatives
Presidents pro tempore of the Connecticut Senate
Republican Party Connecticut state senators
Lieutenant Governors of Connecticut